Engels-Haus is a museum in Wuppertal, Germany, located in the house where Friedrich Engels (1820–1895) grew up.

The father of Engels, Friedrich Engels Sr., was born in the house in 1796.

The museum was opened in 1970 on the 150th anniversary of Engels' birth, and became a popular destination for tourists and socialists.  The museum was closed in 2016 for refurbishment. The museum's planned re-opening in 2020 for the 200th anniversary of Engels' birth was cancelled due to the COVID-19 pandemic. Nevertheless, in the presence of the Minister for Culture and Science of the State of North Rhine-Westphalia, Isabel Pfeiffer-Poensgen, and over 300 guests, the museum was reopened with the new permanent exhibition on the life and work of Friedrich Engels on 11 September 2021. The highlight of this event was the unveiling of the international art project Inside out Engels.

See also 

 Museum Industriekultur Wuppertal
 Friedrich Engels
 Karl Marx House

References 

Friedrich Engels
Houses in Germany
Biographical museums in Germany
1970 establishments in Germany
Buildings and structures in Wuppertal
Historic house museums in Germany